Messina Wilson Allman (5 April 1883 – December 1943) was an English footballer who played as a forward.

He turned professional with Burslem Port Vale in April 1903, before joining Reading in May 1905. Two years later he signed with Portsmouth via Plymouth Argyle, and helped the "Greens" to finish as Southern League runners-up in 1907–08. He joined Stoke in May 1908, before moving on to Liverpool two months later. He then had spells with Grantham, Wrexham, and Ton Pentre; scoring the winning goal for Wrexham in the 1910 Welsh Cup final. He joined Leicester Fosse in November 1911, before transferring to Croydon Common in June 1912. He helped Croydon to win the Southern League Division Two title in 1913–14. After a spell guesting for Arsenal during World War I, he ended his career after the war with non-playing spells with Crystal Palace and Maidstone United.

Career

Burslem Port Vale
Allman signed for Football League Second Division club Burslem Port Vale in April 1903, having previously played for local minor-league sides Burslem Park Boys and Burslem Higherhave. He scored his first goal at the Athletic Ground on 16 January 1904, in a 2–2 draw with Burnley, and finished the 1903–04 campaign with three goals in nine appearances. He hit eight goals in 29 games in 1904–05 to finish as the club's top scorer.

Southern League
He transferred to Reading in May 1905. He scored ten goals in 25 Southern League games in 1905–06 and then seven goals in 36 games in 1906–07. He then departed Elm Park, and started the 1907–08 season at Portsmouth, but moved on to Plymouth Argyle in December 1907 after finding his first team opportunities at Fratton Park limited. He scored six goals in 19 league games to help the "Greens" to finish as runners-up in the Southern League.

Later career
Allman returned to Staffordshire in May 1908 to sign with Stoke, but never featured at the Victoria Ground, and so instead moved on to Liverpool two months later. He played one First Division game for the "Reds", before he left Anfield. He spent the next few years with non-league sides Grantham, Wrexham, and Ton Pentre, and scored the winning goal for Wrexham over Chester in the 1910 Welsh Cup final. He joined Leicester Fosse in November 1911. He scored three goals in seven Second Division games in 1911–12, before leaving Filbert Street for Croydon Common in June 1912. He scored 18 goals in 43 games in 1912–13, before hitting 13 goals in 42 games in 1913–14 to help the club to the Division Two title. He then hit three goals in 28 appearances in 1914–15, and was the last player to score a goal for Croydon Common. He guested for Arsenal during World War I and served as a gunner in the Royal Garrison Artillery. After the war he served Crystal Palace and Maidstone United as a reserve player. He later worked as a tramway conductor in Croydon.

Career statistics

Honours

Wrexham
Welsh Cup: 1909–10

Croydon Common
Southern League Second Division: 1913–14

References

Sportspeople from Burslem
English footballers
Association football forwards
Port Vale F.C. players
Reading F.C. players
Portsmouth F.C. players
Plymouth Argyle F.C. players
Stoke City F.C. players
Liverpool F.C. players
Wrexham A.F.C. players
Grantham Town F.C. players
Ton Pentre F.C. players
Leicester City F.C. players
Croydon Common F.C. players
Arsenal F.C. wartime guest players
British Army personnel of World War I
Crystal Palace F.C. players
Maidstone United F.C. (1897) players
English Football League players
Southern Football League players
Royal Garrison Artillery soldiers
Military personnel from Staffordshire
1883 births
1943 deaths